Alan Berkman (September 4, 1945 – June 5, 2009) was an American physician and activist in the Students for a Democratic Society and Weather Underground who went to prison for his involvement in a number of robberies staged by the organizations and their offshoots. Released after eight years in prison for armed robbery and explosives possession, Berkman provided medical care to the homeless and founded Health GAP to help provide AIDS pharmaceuticals to some of the world's poorest nations.

Biography
Berkman was born in Brooklyn and moved with his family to Middletown, Orange County, New York. He was an Eagle Scout who graduated as the salutatorian of his high school class. He earned his undergraduate degree at Cornell University, graduating as an honor student in 1967. Berkman received his medical training at the Columbia University College of Physicians and Surgeons, which he completed in 1971.

His politics and practice of medicine often overlapped, including his treatment of prisoners after the September 1971 Attica riots. He and his wife evaded the cordon established by the United States Marshals Service during the Wounded Knee incident in 1973.

Brinks robbery and life on the run
The Black Liberation Army and May 19th Communist Movement had organized the October 20, 1981, Brinks robbery in Nanuet, New York, in which $1.6 million was taken from a Brink's armored car. An armored car guard was killed during the robbery. In a shootout shortly after the heist, two police officers were killed. A witness told a grand jury that Berkman had treated one of the holdup group's members for a gunshot wound. Berkman refused to talk and spent almost a year in jail for civil contempt. Indicted as an accessory after the fact, Berkman jumped bail and went underground. Berkman's lawyers claimed that he was the only U.S. doctor to be charged for treating a fugitive since Dr. Samuel Mudd was charged and later convicted for his medical treatment of John Wilkes Booth in 1865 after the Abraham Lincoln assassination.

On the run, Berkman was involved in the gunpoint robbery of a Connecticut supermarket that netted more than $20,000. Berkman and Elizabeth Ann Duke were arrested on May 23, 1985, near Doylestown, Pennsylvania. Their car was found to have a pistol and shotgun, as well as the key to a storage site that held 100 pounds of dynamite. During his years on the run in the 1980s, court papers alleged, he was involved with groups that had staged seven bombings of military and other government facilities, though charges related to the bombings were later dismissed. He was charged as part of the Resistance Conspiracy and convicted for his participation in the supermarket robbery, the proceeds of which, prosecutors alleged, had been used to buy the dynamite. Berkman served eight years of a 10-year sentence.

Post-prison
As a parolee after his release from prison, Berkman worked as a doctor at a South Bronx drug addiction clinic for other parolees. In 1995, Berkman returned to Columbia University as a postdoctoral research fellow and worked at a clinic assisting homeless victims of AIDS with mental illness.

Upon his return to New York, after performing research in South Africa in the late 1990s, Berkman became one of the founders of Health GAP, an organization dedicated to expanding affordable access to AIDS medications such as antiretroviral drugs in the poorest parts of the world. Through such efforts as lobbying to allow foreign governments to impose compulsory licenses to allow local manufacture of medications without the imposition of U.S. trade tariffs, costs for a regimen of AIDS medications that had cost $15,000 annually in the late 1990s had been cut to $150 per year by the time of his death.

Personal life and death
A resident of Manhattan, Berkman died there, aged 63, from lymphoma on June 5, 2009. He was survived by his wife, Dr. Barbara Zeller, as well as two daughters and a grandson.

References

External links
Obituary per Health GAP press release re Dr. Berkman's death

1945 births
2009 deaths
Activists from New York (state)
Columbia University Vagelos College of Physicians and Surgeons alumni
Cornell University alumni
Deaths from cancer in New York (state)
Deaths from lymphoma
Fugitives
Fugitives wanted by the United States
Members of the Weather Underground
People from Brooklyn
People from Manhattan
People from Middletown, Orange County, New York
Physicians from New York City